Juan Bautista is Spanish for John the Baptist. It is a Spanish given name. It may refer to:

People
 Juan Bautista Pastene (1507–1580), Genoese maritime explorer
 Juan Bautista de Toledo (1515–1567), Spanish architect
 Juan Bautista Pomar (1535–1601), Mexican author
 Juan Bautista Villalpando (1552–1608), Spanish priest, scholar and mathematician
 Juan Bautista (theologian) (1555–unknown), Mexican Franciscan theologian and writer
 Juan Bautista Vázquez the Younger (fl. late 16th to early 17th century), Spanish sculptor
 Juan Bautista Maíno (1581–1649), Spanish baroque painter
 Juan Bautista Comes (1582–1643), Spanish composer
 Juan Bautista Martínez del Mazo (1612–1667), Spanish Baroque artist
 Juan Bautista Diamante (1625–1687), Spanish dramatist
 Juan Bautista Cabanilles (1644–1712), Spanish organist and composer
 Juan Bautista Bayuco (1664–unknown), Spanish painter
 Juan Bautista de Anza I (1693–1740), Spanish explorer
 Juan Bautista Rondeau (1735–1813), Spanish Army officer
 Juan Bautista de Anza (1736–1799), Spanish military officer, expeditionary and politician
 Juan Bautista Muñoz (1745–1799), Spanish philosopher and historian
 Juan Bautista Paz (1772–1844), Argentine jurist and lawyer
 Juan Bautista Sancho (1772–1830), Spanish composer and scholar
 Juan Bautista Arismendi (1775–1841), Venezuelan patriot and general
 Juan Bautista Arriaza (1777–1837), Spanish poet and writer
 Juan Bautista Vitón (1780–1868), Spanish politician, merchant and soldier
 Juan Bautista Alvarado (1809–1882), Californio politician
 Juan Bautista Alberdi (1810–1884), Argentine political theorist and diplomat
 Juan Bautista Ceballos (1811–1859), former interim President of Mexico
 Juan Bautista Cambiaso (1820–1886), Genoese-Dominican explorer, admiral and sailor
 Juan Bautista Topete (1821–1885), Spanish admiral and politician
 Juan Bautista Spotorno (1832–1917), former President of Cuba
 Juan Bautista Cabrera (1837–1916), Spanish poet and theologian
 Juan Bautista Gill (1840–1877), former President of Paraguay
 Juan Bautista Medici (1843–1903), Italian-Argentine engineer
 Juan Bautista Gaona (1845–1932), former provisional President of Paraguay
 Juan Bautista Egusquiza (1845–1902), former President of Paraguay
 Juan Bautista Quirós Segura (1853–1934), former President of Costa Rica
 Juan Bautista Aznar-Cabañas (1860–1933), former Prime Minister of Spain
 Juan Bautista Pérez (1869–1952), former President of Venezuela
 Juan Bautista Vicini Burgos (1871–1935), former President of the Dominican Republic
 Juan Bautista Sacasa (1874–1946), former President of Nicaragua
 Juan Bautista Molina (1882–1958), Argentine military commander and ultranationalist
 Juan Bautista Vargas Arreola (1890–1947), Mexican Brigadier general
 Juan Bautista Bairoletto (1894–1931), Argentine outlaw
 Juan Bautista Gutiérrez (1896–unknown), Spanish-Nicaraguan businessman
 Juan Bautista Garcia (1904–1974), Corsican immigrant to Costa Rica
 Juan Bautista Pina (born 1907), Argentine sprinter
 Juan Bautista Besuzzo (1913–unknown), Uruguayan footballer
 Juan Bautista Vicini Cabral (1924–2015), Italian-Dominican businessman
 Juan Bautista Villalba (1924–2003), Paraguayan footballer
 Juan Bautista Avalle-Arce (1927–2009), Argentine Hispanist
 Juan Bautista Agüero (1935–2018), Paraguayan footballer
 Juan Bautista Yofre (born 1946), Argentine politician
 Juan Bautista Hernández Pérez (born 1962), Cuban boxer
 Juan Bautista Esquivel (born 1980), Costa Rican footballer
 Juan Bautista Arricau (born 1998), Argentine footballer
 Juan Bautista Torres (born 2002), Argentine tennis player

Other uses
 Juan Bautista Cambiaso (ship), training ship for the Dominican Navy

See also
 Jean-Baptiste
 João Batista (disambiguation)
 San Juan Bautista (disambiguation)